Wir kaufen Seelen (also known as Seelenankauf or Soul Sale) is a 1998 performance by Austrian art theory group monochrom and is considered a significant work in the group's history and Austrian art history in the 1990s.

On 1 November 1998 (All Souls' Day), monochrom members Johannes Grenzfurthner and Harald Homolka-List (supported by their friend Ulrich Troyer) staged a "spirituo-capitalist booth" at Stock-im-Eisen-Platz (very close to St. Stephen's Cathedral in Vienna's first district) where the project members tried to buy the souls of passers-by for ATS 50 (roughly US$5) per soul. The "acquisition team" performed an "evaluation routine" to check the "quality" of the soul of interested sellers, for example by asking jargon-laden philosophical questions, by using a divining rod and similar pseudoscientific techniques. A total of fifteen were purchased and registered. These souls are still being offered for sale to third parties.

The group sees the project - beyond all philosophical discourses and argumentation seeking to prove the existence of God or an afterlife - in the classical sense of a market driven by supply and demand. For the group it "doesn't actually matter if there is a soul, as long as it can be sold for a profit. The soul is a tradable commodity, a form of virtual capital."

The performance has been presented in exhibitions and debated in magazines and in academic circles.

External links 

 Wir kaufen Seelen (project page)

References

Performances
1998 works
1998 in art
Monochrom